Wild Girl is a 1932 American pre-Code historical drama western film directed by Raoul Walsh and starring Charles Farrell, Joan Bennett, Ralph Bellamy, and Eugene Pallette. The film was based on a play by Paul Armstrong Jr., which in turn was based on the 1889 short story, Salomy Jane's Kiss, and 1910 novel, Salomy Jane's Kiss, by Bret Harte. The story had been previously filmed as Salomy Jane (1914) and Salomy Jane (1923).

Plot
Walsh's only Western between The Big Trail (1930) and Dark Command (1940) is an affectionate parody of the silent westerns Walsh himself made as a young director at Mutual that evolves into a lyrical romance filmed with tenderness and sincerity. Joan Bennett is "the eponymous irrepressible tomboy, who bewitches card sharps and escaped murderers in equal measure in the Redwood forests of the Sierra Nevada mountains".

Cast
Charles Farrell as Billy
Joan Bennett as Salomy Jane
Ralph Bellamy as Jack Marbury
Eugene Pallette as Yuba Bill
Irving Pichel as Rufe Waters
Minna Gombell as Millie
Willard Robertson as Red Pete
Sarah Padden as Lize
Morgan Wallace as Phineas Baldwin

Production
Pre-production began in July, 1932, with members of the Fox company visiting locations in Sequoia National Park. Most of the cast was announced by early August. Shooting began in Sequoia on August 7, and lasted two weeks that same month. The primary farm set, built at picnic ground, became a brief tourist attraction while it stood. Upon the crew's return to Los Angeles on August 31, director Raoul Walsh told the press that he was very excited about Joan Bennett's performance: "Joan Bennett's came alive in this film... And I think I am a lucky guy to have directed her in it." An additional Western set was built at the Fox Studios.

Reception
"Beautifully photographed and robustly directed adventure set in the West, centering around a backwoods girl, delightfully played by Joan Bennett, and her dealings with several men: a good-hearted gambler, a hypocritical, lecherous politician, a two-faced rancher, and a young stranger..." — Peter Bogdanovich

See also
Salomy Jane

References

External links
 
 
 MoMA To Save and Project Festival 10: Day One (2012/10/11) includes synopsis of Wild Girl

1932 films
Fox Film films
American Western (genre) films
1932 Western (genre) films
American black-and-white films
American films based on plays
Films directed by Raoul Walsh
Films shot in California
American historical drama films
1930s historical drama films
1932 drama films
1930s English-language films
1930s American films